State Route 161 (SR 161) is a state highway in the U.S. state of California that runs along the California–Oregon state line in Siskiyou County. It begins at U.S. Route 97 north of Dorris and goes east to the intersection of SR 139 and Oregon Route 39 north of Tulelake. SR 161 is part of the Volcanic Legacy Scenic Byway.

Route description
SR 161 begins at an intersection with U.S. Route 97 north of Dorris. The route travels east past Indian Tom Lake, bending to the south and passing by Lake Miller and Sheepy Lake. SR 161 continues past the Lower Klamath National Wildlife Refuge, which includes Lower Klamath Lake, and White Lake, now paralleling the state line again to the intersection of Route 139 and Oregon Route 39 north of Tulelake in the community of Hatfield.

SR 161 is not part of the National Highway System, a network of highways that are considered essential to the country's economy, defense, and mobility by the Federal Highway Administration. SR 161 is eligible for the State Scenic Highway System, but it is not officially designated as a scenic highway by the California Department of Transportation.

SR 161 is part of a spur route of the Volcanic Legacy Scenic Byway, an All-American Road, that heads towards Tule Lake and Lava Beds National Monument.

Major intersections

External links
Caltrans: Route 161 highway conditions
California Highways: Route 161

References

161
State Route 161